Sumiko (written: すみこ, 純子, 澄子, 寿美子, スミ子 or すみ子) is a feminine Japanese given name. Notable people with the name include:

, Japanese actress
Sumiko Hennessy (born 1937), Japanese-American social worker and academic
, Japanese actress
, Japanese psychologist, magazine editor and academic
, Japanese badminton player
, Japanese actress and dancer
, Japanese actress
, Japanese singer and actress
, Japanese voice actress
Sumiko Tachibana, character in Yandere Simulator
, Japanese sprinter
, Japanese cross-country skier
, Japanese-Canadian Permanent Makeup Artist

See also
4100 Sumiko, a main-belt asteroid

Japanese feminine given names